Santa Maria College is an independent Roman Catholic single-sex primary and secondary day and boarding school for girls, located in Attadale, a southern suburb of Perth, Western Australia.

Established by the Sisters of Mercy in 1938, the school currently caters for approximately 1,300 students from Year 5 to Year 12, including 150 boarders.

The college is affiliated with the Association of Heads of Independent Schools of Australia (AHISA), the Australian Boarding Schools' Association (ABSA), the Alliance of Girls' Schools Australasia (AGSA) and the Independent Girls Schools Sports Association (IGSSA).

Santa Maria's brother school is Aquinas College located in Salter Point.

History 
The College's Mercy heritage and history goes back to the arrival of seven Sisters of Mercy in Perth in 1846.  They were led by Ursula Frayne.

The Sisters opened their first school on St George's Terrace in February 1846. As enrolments increased, school buildings, including a boarding school, were built in the grounds of the present Mercedes College. As the demand for boarding places increased from country families, the Mercy Superior at the time, Brigid McDonald, and her Council resolved to build a new ladies' college for boarding and day students in the bush land in Attadale.  Santa Maria College opened its doors in 1938. The founding principal was Mary Bertrand Corbett.

The post-war period brought with it a rapid expansion in residential development around the college. As a result, there was a growth in student numbers and the student population at Santa Maria College changed from primarily boarders to a majority of day students.

Today Santa Maria College is a community of 1,300 students from Years 5 to 12.

Governance 
Mercy Education Limited (Mercy Education) is the delegated authority, which oversees the operation of the Education ministry of the Institute of Sisters of Mercy of Australia and Papua New Guinea (ISMAPNG).

Through its board of directors, Mercy Education is responsible for the governance and operation of eleven Mercy Sponsored Colleges owned by ISMAPNG, including Santa Maria College. Mercy Education is the employer of the principal and staff of twelve Mercy Colleges.

Associations 
Santa Maria College is a Catholic Education Office affiliated education provider. It is also affiliated with the Association of Independent Schools of Western Australia.

Santa Maria College is a member of the Independent Girls Schools Sporting Association.

Principals 

The following individuals have served as Principal of Santa Maria College:

House system 
Before the current house system came into operation the students were divided into teams - which were essentially for sporting carnivals. The houses were initially School (red), Mercian (white), Trinity (Blue), however, as the number of students increased a fourth team was added in 1963 - Xavier (gold)
Santa Maria College, as with most Australian schools, utilises a House system. Students are divided into eight Houses, for the purpose of morning meetings in House groups and Homerooms, and intra-school competition. The Houses are named after notable figures in the Sisters of Mercy's heritage in Western Australia. Dillon, de la Hoyde, Frayne, Kelly, O'Donnell and O'Reilly are named after six of the Sisters who journeyed to Western Australia from Ireland and set up the first Catholic High School in the state - Victoria Square School, now known as Mercedes College. In 2007, two new houses were added - Corbett, named after the school's first Principal, Bertrand Corbett, and Byrne.

Each House competes to earn points towards the "McAuley Shield", through various interhouse events, including: swimming, athletics, cross-country, volleyball, soccer, debating and public speaking. In 2007, the interhouse events were expanded to include an arts festival after the lobbying of several students for more events that were not sports-orientated. The arts festival required each house to prepare a short play to showcase their acting abilities.  this festival has been replaced by a theatresports competition.

Boarding 
The boarding community is home to 150 girls, predominantly from rural WA. The community is divided into four individual houses. Two housemothers are assigned to each house.

Uniform 
The uniform consists of a green and white dress worn during summer, worn with a white socks and black leather shoes. A formal winter uniform is also required which consists of black stockings instead of socks, a bottle green, red and white striped tie, school blazer, green jumper and a green red and white tartan skirt. The sport uniform consists of a white shirt, and red shorts.

Notable alumnae 

 Lieutenant Colonel Helen Adamson (1943)nurse; Matron-in-Chief, Royal Australian Army Nursing Corps; awarded the Royal Red Cross in 1981
 Jessica Bennettguitarist; founding member of the alternative rock/pop punk band, Lash
 Emma Boothmodel and actress
 Lucy Chaffer (2000)skeleton racer; competed in the 2014 Winter Olympics
 Dorothy Clarke (1938) paediatric nurse
 Geraldine Doogue  (1968)journalist, broadcaster and author
 Annette Goerke (née Parkes, 1956)organist; recipient of a Churchill Fellowship; awarded the Crucem Pro Ecclesia et Pontifice for her services to St Mary's Cathedral
 Carmen Lawrence (1964)former politician and academic; the first female Premier of Western Australia and the first woman to become the premier of an Australian state; subsequently a Minister in the Keating government
 Judith Lucystand-up comedian, radio presenter and actress, including starring in Crackerjack
 Rose McAleer  (1947)pathologist
 Irene McCormack  (1954)religious sister; teacher; missionary; executed by the Shining Path Guerrilla group in 1991
 Marie Mahood (née Healy, 1943)journalist, teacher and author
 Ashleigh Nelson (2004)hockey player; completed in the 2012 Olympics; 2010 Commonwealth Games Gold Medalist
 Sue Palfreyman (née James, 1969rower; completed in the 1980 Olympics
 Jaclyn Pearsonpercussionist; founding member of the alternative rock/pop punk band, Lash
 Ailsa Piper (1976)actor in both stage and television productions and is best known for her appearance in Neighbours; author
 Robyn Mary Quinteacher and academic; Pro Vice-Chancellor (Teaching and Learning) at the Curtin University of Technology
 Belinda-Lee Reidvocalist, guitarist; founding member of the alternative rock/pop punk band, Lash
 Prue-Anne Reynalds (1974)cyclist; 1984 and 1992 Paralympics
 Lisa Russ (née Oldenhof, 1996)kayaker; competed in the 2004 and 2008 Olympics
 Micaela Slayfordvocalist; bassist; founding member of the alternative rock/pop punk band, Lash
 Halina Szunejko  (née Czekalowska, 1954)community activist; teacher; writer

See also 
 
List of schools in the Perth metropolitan area
Catholic education in Australia

References

External links 
 Santa Maria College website

Girls' schools in Western Australia
Catholic primary schools in Perth, Western Australia
Boarding schools in Western Australia
Educational institutions established in 1938
Catholic secondary schools in Perth, Western Australia
Catholic boarding schools in Australia
Sisters of Mercy schools
Alliance of Girls' Schools Australasia
1938 establishments in Australia